Korobeyniki is a rural locality (a village) in Chernushinsky District, Perm Krai, Russia. The population was 197 as of 2010. There are 7 streets.

Geography 
Korobeyniki is located 33 km north of Chernushka (the district's administrative centre) by road. Demenevo is the nearest rural locality.

References 

Rural localities in Chernushinsky District